Western Virginia is a geographic region in Virginia comprising the Shenandoah Valley and Southwest Virginia. Generally, areas in Virginia located west of, or (in many cases) within, the piedmont region are considered part of western Virginia.

The United States District Court for the Western District of Virginia covers most of the state's land area, and includes most cities and counties in central and southern Virginia. By this definition, nearly all places in the state located west of the coastal plain, would be considered western Virginia.

The Crooked Road celebrates the musical heritage of this region.

 
Regions of Virginia